Mytishchi is the name of several inhabited localities in Russia.

Urban localities
Mytishchi, a city in Mytishchinsky District of Moscow Oblast

Rural localities
Mytishchi, Gavrilovo-Posadsky District, Ivanovo Oblast, a village in Gavrilovo-Posadsky District, Ivanovo Oblast
Mytishchi, Komsomolsky District, Ivanovo Oblast, a selo in Komsomolsky District, Ivanovo Oblast
Mytishchi, Kostroma Oblast, a village in Nezhitinskoye Settlement of Makaryevsky District of Kostroma Oblast
Mytishchi, Yaroslavl Oblast, a village in Bolsheselsky Rural Okrug of Bolsheselsky District of Yaroslavl Oblast